The Arrei Mountains also known as the "Roof of Ali Sabieh", are a mountain range in the southern Ali Sabieh Region in Djibouti. The mountains constitute the highest point in Ali Sabieh region. The Issa Somali have a long history in the Arrei Mountains.

History
In 1915, the Ethio-Djibouti Railways traversed the local Ali Sabieh.

It is the main town in the region, and is located 7 km northwest. The area is predominantly inhabited by the Issa Somali.

Fauna
A number of birds are found in the mountains including Egyptian vulture. Other endemic species include a number of geckos and lizards.

Climate
Arrei Mountain's altitude and location and topography frequently lead to cool and cloudy weather conditions, which can pose a danger to ill-equipped walkers. The Arrei Mountains receives the bulk of its precipitation between the months of June and mid-September, averaging just under 269 mm of rainfall annually. The fog was present on the summit for almost 75% of the time between November and January, and 6% of the time in March and August. Arrei Mountains receives additional precipitation in the form of fog and summer rains.

References
Ârréï (Arrei)

Mountains of Djibouti